Blackman Bay is located on the south-east coast of Tasmania. It extends from the bay's inlet at the southern peninsula of Marion Bay to the village of Dunalley. Historically this bay was referred to as "Frederick Henry Bay".

References

Bays of Tasmania
South East coast of Tasmania
Forestier Peninsula